is a Japanese adult visual novel, developed by August, released as a limited edition version on January 25, 2008 playable on Windows PCs as a DVD. Fortune Arterial is August's fifth game, preceded by other titles such as Tsuki wa Higashi ni Hi wa Nishi ni: Operation Sanctuary, and Yoake Mae yori Ruriiro na. A manga based on the story, drawn by Akane Sasaki, was serialized between the September 2007 and April 2008 issues of ASCII Media Works' Dengeki G's Magazine; the manga transferred to ASCII Media Works' Dengeki G's Festival! Comic in April 2008. A second manga started serialization in the November 2007 issue of Kadokawa Shoten's gaming magazine Comptiq, illustrated by Miki Kodama. A 12-episode anime adaptation produced by Zexcs and Feel aired in Japan between October and December 2010.

Gameplay
The gameplay requires little interaction from the player as a majority of the game is spent simply reading text that appears on the screen. This text represents either dialogue between the various characters or the inner thoughts of the protagonist. Every so often, the player will come to a "decision point" where they must choose from options that are displayed on the screen, typically two to three at a time. During these times, gameplay pauses until a choice is made that furthers the plot in a specific direction, depending on which choice the player makes. There are five main plot lines that the player will have the chance to experience, one for each of the heroines in the story. In order to view the five plot lines to their entirety, the player will have to replay the game multiple times and choose different choices during the decision points in order to further the plot in an alternate direction.

Plot
Fortune Arterial'''s story revolves around the male protagonist Kohei Hasekura, who transfers into a prestigious public school in the style of a Western six-year school encompassing junior-high and high school students. Soon after transferring, he discovers that one of the students in the class next door to his, Erika Sendo, is in fact a type of vampire.

Characters

Main characters

 (Drama CD) / Daisuke Ono (anime), Natsumi Takamori (childhood in anime)
Kohei is the protagonist of the story and is a fifth-year student. He has lived on the island previously and was friends with the Yuki sisters. Since he moved away he has cultivated a habit of not making friends due to constant school transfers (since he would have to move away as soon as he made new friends, he decided not to bother making friends in the first place). Now that he has returned to the island on his own and entered Shuchikan Academy, he plans to stay for a while.

 (credited as Sakiko Mimura in the PC version)
Erika is a fifth-year student as well as the student council vice-president. She is a vampire. She excels in literature classes and martial arts, and is very attractive, making her popular in her school. She has an inquisitive personality and likes to do things directly. Once she has her mind set on something, she becomes very pushy and will take her time making plans to make sure she gets her way. Her older brother Iori is the student council president.

 (credited as Airi Himekawa in the PC version)
Shiro is a delicate fourth-year student who is very shy. She was introduced to the student council by her brother who was already on the council, and it was decided that Shiro would become the treasurer. However, she is often missing from student council meetings after school and is only known for serving tea to the student council. Shiro joins an organization named "Laurel Ring" in order to support a chapel and she cherishes a white pet rabbit named  at the chapel.

 (PC) / Erika Narumi (anime)
Kiriha is one of Kohei's classmates. She is most often seen alone and does not talk much, even when spoken to directly. She does not have many interests, and is in no clubs. She has been exceptional in math ever since she was young. She is a vampire servant, which makes her immortal and has given her superhuman powers, though she does not need blood and has lost her sense of taste.

 (PC) / Hitomi Nabatame (anime)
Kanade is Kohei's childhood friend and Haruna's older sister. She is constantly in high spirits, and likes to do things at her own pace. She loves her younger sister so much that she says that if she had been born a man from another family, she would have definitely married Haruna eventually. She often calls her sister "Hina". She is the resident adviser in the Academy dormitory.

 (PC) / Hiroko Taguchi (anime)
Haruna is in Kohei's class and is also a childhood friend of his. She has a bright personality, and enjoys helping others. She lost the memories of her early childhood (including Kohei) after an accident.

Miya is a new female character included in the PlayStation 3 version, Fortune Arterial: Akai Yakusoku.

Secondary characters

 (PC) / Junichi Suwabe (anime)
Iori is Erika's older brother, and is the student council president. He is a huge jokester unlike that to the serious Togi. Just like his sister, he too is a vampire. He gives off the air of a male model, and many girls in his school want to go out with him. He is generally popular with everyone in his school.

 (PC) / Tomohiro Tsuboi (anime)
Seiichirō is also the treasurer of the student council, along with his sister Shiro. He is very kind with his sister, and may have a sister complex. He used to be the president of the Japanese archery club.

 (PC) / Kentarō Itō (anime)
Tsukasa is one of Kohei's classmates otherwise known as "Heiji". After Kohei transferred schools, he became a good friend of his. He may seem like a delinquent, but he is very friendly. He has a twin sister.

 (PC) / Chizuko Hoshino (anime)
Shizuko is the caretaker of a certain church on the island, as well as the one in-charge of the female side of the school dormitory. She is always wearing a sister outfit. Her Christian name is "Margarita", while most students address her as "Sister Amaike" instead. Also she is known around campus for carrying a frying pan. She is typically sister-like and a no-nonsense type of person most of the time, however she is also known to be very scary when she loses her temper. Kohei fears her as "The Person who cannot take jokes". Kanade calls her "Maru-chan" and Iori calls her "Shizuko-chan", which she doesn't seem too happy about.

 (PC/anime)
Masanori is the homeroom teacher of Kohei, Haruna, Kiriha and Tsukasa's class, as well as the one in-charge of the male side of the school dormitory. He teaches Chemistry. Has a mild personality. Kohei saw him riding a scooter without a license and thinks of him as "Someone who rides a stolen bike". Takes towards an independence and autonomy approach in education. He is usually known by the nickname "Aonori", while Kanade calls him "Noripii". Was known to be a troublemaker during his younger days.

 (PC/anime)
Her name is unknown. She is a sixth-year student as well as the president of the Art Club. She is troubled over the declining in the number of members in the Art Club. Has a very straightforward personality. Tsukasa works part-time at the sushi bar which is owned by her family, as well as her residence. Kohei falls in love with her if you cannot end up with any of the five heroines, which is known as the Bad End Route.

 (PC) / Kaori Mizuhashi (anime)
Kaya is Erika and Iori's mother. Estimated to be at least 251 years old, yet she looks like a child, giving people the image that she is Iori and Erika's younger sister instead. Erika looks like a splitting image of her, the only difference being Erika's more matured body and that Kaya's eyes are constantly red in color, which every vampire has when they have their vampiric impulses.

Development

Release history
August first announced the production of a new visual novel at Comiket 71, and on February 21, 2007, they made the official announcement for Fortune Arterial on their official website. The game was first introduced to the public in Japan as a limited edition version on January 25, 2008 as a DVD playable on a Microsoft Windows PC. The regular edition followed on February 29, 2008. Kadokawa Shoten had planned on releasing a port for the PlayStation 3 and a spin-off game for the PlayStation Portable, but they later cancelled both games.

Related media

Manga
The manga adaptation, under the title Fortune Arterial Character's Prelude, was serialized in ASCII Media Works' Dengeki G's Magazine between the September 2007 and April 2008 issues, illustrated by Akane Sasaki. The manga transferred to Dengeki G's Festival! Comic, a special edition version of Dengeki G's Magazine, starting with the second volume sold on April 26, 2008. The first bound volume was released on June 27, 2008 under ASCII Media Works' Dengeki Comics imprint. A second manga, called simply Fortune Arterial, started serialization in the November 2007 issue of Kadokawa Shoten's gaming magazine Comptiq, illustrated by Miki Kodama. The first volume for the second manga was released on July 26, 2008 under Kadokawa Shoten's Kadokawa Comics Ace imprint; the sixth volume was released on February 26, 2011.  Enterbrain published ten volumes of a manga anthology titled Magi-Cu 4-koma Fortune Arterial released between April 25, 2008 and February 25, 2010. Ichijinsha published three volumes of another anthology titled Fortune Arterial Comic Anthology between June 25 and October 25, 2008.

Books and publications
Harvest published a series of six erotic light novels, each focusing on a different heroine, between June 10, 2008 and June 1, 2009. Runa Okada wrote the novels and the game's original artist Bekkankō provided the illustrations. Prior to the game's release, Enterbrain published a fan book on November 21, 2007 titled Tech Gain Super Prelude: Fortune Arterial containing information on the development of the game and information on the game itself. ASCII Media Works published a fan book on June 20, 2008 titled Fortune Arterial Perfect Visual Book.

Audio dramas
Marine Entertainment released a series of five drama CDs titled Fortune Arterial: Through the Season between August 15 and December 28, 2008. Each of the CDs covered one of the heroines and featured the same voice cast as the game. An Internet radio show titled August Broadcasting Office: Shuchikan Academy Student Council Business Trip had a pre-broadcast on August 13, 2009 and started regular biweekly broadcasts on September 10, 2009. The show is produced by Marine Entertainment and hosted by Junichi Suwabe and Rie Kanda, the voices of Iori and Erika Sendo. The first volume of a CD compilation containing the first six broadcasts was released on December 29, 2009 by Marine Entertainment.

Anime
A 12-episode anime television series adaptation titled  produced by Zexcs and Feel and directed by Munenori Nawa aired on TV Tokyo between October 9 and December 25, 2010 in Japan. An original video animation episode was bundled with the limited sixth volume of Miki Kodama's manga Fortune Arterial.

Episode list

Music
The opening theme for the Fortune Arterial visual novel is  sung by Mizuho. An insert song in the game is  sung by Veil. A maxi single containing the opening theme and insert song was released on January 25, 2008. An image song for the game, "It's My Precious Time!", is also sung by Mizuho and a single containing the image song was released on October 25, 2007. August released the game's original soundtrack on May 30, 2008. A character song album titled Fortune Arterial Feeling Assort was released by Geneon on August 14, 2009. Shot Music released a remix album, Fortune Arterial -Omnibus Edit- P-O-P'', with remixes of the game's background music and theme songs on January 29, 2010.

References

External links
Fortune Arterial official website 
Fortune Arterial at Crunchyroll

2007 manga
2008 video games
Anime television series based on video games
ASCII Media Works manga
Bishōjo games
Dengeki Comics
Dengeki G's Magazine
Drama anime and manga
Eroge
Fantasy anime and manga
Fantasy video games
Feel (animation studio)
Harem anime and manga
Harem video games
Japan-exclusive video games
Kadokawa Dwango franchises
Kadokawa Shoten manga
Manga based on video games
Romance anime and manga
Romance video games
School life in anime and manga
Seinen manga
TV Tokyo original programming
Vampires in anime and manga
Video games about vampires
Video games developed in Japan
Visual novels
Windows games
Zexcs
August (company) games